Gutter Tactics is an album by alternative hip hop duo dälek, released by Ipecac Recordings in January 2009.

The intro track samples a controversial speech by Pastor Jeremiah Wright.

Track listing

All tracks written by dälek.

Personnel 

Band members
 MC Dälek – lead vocals, production and songwriting
 Oktopus – production and songwriting

Other personnel
Joshua Booth – songwriting and live overdubs
Destructo Swarmbots – live overdubs
Joe Kostroun – live overdubs
Johnny Vignault – live overdubs
Dean Rispler – live overdubs
Dev-One – additional vocals on "Atyical Stereotype"

Album art
Paul Romano – art direction, artwork, design and Gutter Tactics Graffiti piece
Marco Burbano – Gutter Tag
Opiem – dälek graffiti piece
Alexandra Momin – New York City photos

References

Ipecac Recordings albums
2009 albums
Dälek albums